Mein Schiff Herz (formerly MV Mercury, Celebrity Mercury and Mein Schiff 2) is the second of two s operated by TUI Cruises.  Built for Celebrity Cruises at the Meyer Werft shipyard in Papenburg, Germany, she was launched on 11July 1997, and was christened and entered service as MV Mercury on 27October 1997.

In 2008, after some eleven years in operation as Mercury, she was renamed Celebrity Mercury.  In 2011, she was transferred to the fleet of TUI Cruises, a joint venture between TUI AG and Celebrity Cruises' owner Royal Caribbean Cruises Ltd.  At the same time, she was renamed Mein Schiff 2.

In January 2019, she was again renamed, as Mein Schiff Herz.  Her sister ship Marella Explorer is the former MV Galaxy, also previously operated by Celebrity Cruises.

History

On 19 May 2006, just prior to Mercurys planned departure for an Alaska cruise, Seattle-based inspectors from the U.S. Coast Guard arrested the captain of the Mercury for intoxication during a routine safety inspection. Celebrity Cruises arranged for a replacement, and fired the original captain.

While cruising from Charleston, South Carolina to the eastern Caribbean in February 2010, the ship was struck with a major outbreak of norovirus, affecting nearly 500 people on board, out of a total of just over 1,800.  According to Celebrity Cruises, those taken ill were treated with over-the-counter medicine. Additionally, a doctor and two nurses joined the ship midway to assist with the outbreak.

TUI Cruises

In February 2011 Celebrity Mercury left Celebrity Cruises to be renovated by Imtech and join TUI Cruises' fleet as Mein Schiff 2, alongside , her sister ship, the former Celebrity Galaxy. In May 2015, TUI Group announced that as part of their modernization strategy, TUI Cruises' Mein Schiff 1 and Mein Schiff 2 would be transferred to Thomson Cruises over the next few years.

In March 2018 TUI Cruises announced  that Mein Schiff 2 would remain in the fleet and sail under a new name. In October 2018 the name was announced as Mein Schiff Herz. It was also announced that she will be handed over to Marella Cruises in April 2022. A new ship, built in 2019, is now known as Mein Schiff 2.

References

External links

Official Mein Schiff 2 page on tuicruises.com 
Official Celebrity Mercury UK site

1997 ships
Ships of Celebrity Cruises
Ships built in Papenburg